Detective Kitty O'Day is a 1944 American comedy mystery film directed by William Beaudine and starring Jean Parker, Peter Cookson and Tim Ryan. The film was intended as an attempt to create a new low-budget detective series, but only one sequel, Adventures of Kitty O'Day (1945), was made.

Plot
After her boss is murdered, secretary and aspiring detective Kitty O'Day sees a chance to put her skills to the test to the annoyance of the investigating police officer Inspector Clancy. When Clancy won't properly investigate the dead man's widow, O'Day takes it upon herself to unmask the killer - with the reluctant assistance of her boyfriend Johnny Jones.

Cast
 Jean Parker as Kitty O'Day  
 Peter Cookson as Johnny Jones  
 Tim Ryan as Inspector Clancy 
 Veda Ann Borg as Mrs. Wentworth  
 Edward Gargan as Mike 
 Douglas Fowley as Harry Downs 
 Olaf Hytten as Charles, Wentworth's Butler  
 Edward Earle as Oliver M. Wentworth  
 Herbert Heyes as Attorney Robert Jeffers

See also
List of American films of 1944

References

Bibliography
 Gates, Phillipa. Detecting Women: Gender and the Hollywood Detective Film. SUNY Press, 2011.
 Marshall, Wendy L. William Beaudine: From Silents to Television. Scarecrow Press, 2005.

External links

1944 films
American comedy mystery films
American black-and-white films
1940s comedy mystery films
1940s English-language films
Films directed by William Beaudine
Monogram Pictures films
Films produced by Lindsley Parsons
1944 comedy films
1940s American films